Nina Dübbers (born 24 June 1980) is a former German tennis player.

Dübbers, who won two singles and two doubles ITF tournaments in her career, reached a singles ranking high of world number 166 on 10 June 2002.

She qualified for the first round of the 2001 US Open – Women's singles, but lost 3–6, 2–6 to 18th seed Sandrine Testud.

ITF finals

Singles (2–1)

Doubles (2–0)

References

External links
 
 

1980 births
Living people
Sportspeople from Heidelberg
German female tennis players
Heidelberg University alumni
Tennis people from Baden-Württemberg